The Royal Park Theatre is a theatre in Brussels, Belgium. It is located at 3, Rue de la Loi/Wetstraat, on the edge of Brussels Park, facing the Belgian House of Parliament (Palace of the Nation). It is served by Brussels Central Station, as well as by the metro stations Parc/Park (on lines 1 and 5) and Arts-Loi/Kunst-Wet (on lines 2 and 6).

History

Early history
Built in 1782 to plans by the Belgian-Austrian architect Louis Montoyer, the Park Theatre was at first an annex to the Theatre of La Monnaie. The brothers Alexandre and Herman Bultos exploited both theatres at the same time, with the Park Theatre used for plays featuring young actors, as a sort of drama school for La Monnaie. In 1807, under the French regime, it was closed by Napoleon's decree on the theatres, but re-opened in 1814, and was occupied by a British company for a year then a Dutch company for a few months.

From 1819, the City of Brussels, owner of these two Royal Theatres, granted a concession to one director after another. The company and repertoire were identical yet distinct, with the Park Theatre specialising in vaudeville and boulevard theatre. From 1850 to 1854, the Park Theatre hosted Dutch productions, then specialised in operetta and opéra-comique, and finally (from  1869) in comedies. During the First World War, both theatres were requisitioned and the Park Theatre became a playhouse for the German garrison. Returning as a francophone theatre in 1919, it put on classic pieces featuring Belgian actors.

Contemporary
From 1947 to 1964, under the direction of Oscar Lejeune, the theatre hosted a performance by the Comédie-Française every year. In 1976, the Royal Park Theatre became a "Public Utility Establishment", under the sole direction of Jean Nergal, who remained director until his death on 3 January 1987. Yves Larec was appointed director to succeed him; he took office on 1 February 1987. Under his direction, the Park Theatre was distinguished by a programme where classics and contemporary creations alternated, in spectacular staging and with a focus on comedies. After 24 years at the head of the theatre, Thierry Debroux succeeded Larec as director in 2010.

See also
 History of Brussels
 Culture of Belgium
 Belgium in "the long nineteenth century"

References

Bibliography
 Renieu, Lionel, Histoire des Théâtres de Bruxelles depuis leur origine jusqu'a ce jour (in French), II, Paris, Ducharte and Van Buggenhout (1928), p. 937–951.
 Fetis, François-Joseph, Notes sur les conditions acoustics des salles de concert ou de spectacle in Bulletins de l'Académie royale des Sciences, des Lettres et des Beaux-Arts de Belgique (in French), XVI, Brussels (1849), p. 517–530.
 Delhasse, Félix, Annuaire Dramatique de Belgique (in French), Brussels, J.A. Lelong (1845), p. 72–74.

External links

 

Parc
City of Brussels
1782 establishments in the Habsburg monarchy
1782 establishments in the Holy Roman Empire
Establishments in the Austrian Netherlands
Neoclassical architecture in Belgium